is  the former Head coach of the Levanga Hokkaido in the Japanese JBL.

Head coaching record

|- 
| style="text-align:left;"|Levanga Hokkaido
| style="text-align:left;"|2012-13
| 42||6||36|||| style="text-align:center;"|8th|||-||-||-||
| style="text-align:center;"|-
|-

References

1959 births
Living people
Basketball coaches from Montana
Levanga Hokkaido coaches